Sudan competed at the 2020 Summer Olympics in Tokyo. Originally scheduled to take place during the summer of 2020, the Games were rescheduled for 23 July to 8 August 2021, due to the COVID-19 pandemic. This was the nation's twelfth appearance at the Summer Olympics.

Competitors
The following is a list of the number of competitors in the Games.

Athletics

Sudan received a universality slot from the World Athletics to send a male track and field athlete to the Olympics.

Track & road events

Judo

Sudan received an invitation from the Tripartite Commission and the International Judo Federation to send Mohamed Abdalarasool in the men's lightweight category (73 kg) to the Olympics.

Rowing

Sudan received an invitation from the Tripartite Commission and World Rowing to send a rower in the women's single sculls to the Tokyo regatta, marking the nation's debut in the sport.

Qualification Legend: FA=Final A (medal); FB=Final B (non-medal); FC=Final C (non-medal); FD=Final D (non-medal); FE=Final E (non-medal); FF=Final F (non-medal); SA/B=Semifinals A/B; SC/D=Semifinals C/D; SE/F=Semifinals E/F; QF=Quarterfinals; R=Repechage

Swimming

Sudan received a universality invitation from FINA to send two top-ranked swimmers (one per gender) in their respective individual events to the Olympics, based on the FINA Points System of June 28, 2021.

References

Nations at the 2020 Summer Olympics
2020